Arkadiusz Michalski (born 7 January 1990) is a Polish Olympic weightlifter. He represented his country at the 2016 Summer Olympics.

References

External links 
 

1990 births
Living people
Polish male weightlifters
Weightlifters at the 2016 Summer Olympics
Olympic weightlifters of Poland
People from Głogów
World Weightlifting Championships medalists
European Weightlifting Championships medalists
Weightlifters at the 2020 Summer Olympics
20th-century Polish people
21st-century Polish people